McComish is a surname. Notable people with the surname include:

Virginia McComish (born 1998), Australian Entrepreneur
John McComish (born 1943), American politician
Mike McComish (born 1983), Northern Irish rugby union player

Anglicised Scottish Gaelic-language surnames
Patronymic surnames